Chernichevo may refer to:

 Chernichevo, Kardzhali Province, a village in the municipality of Krumovgrad, Kardzhali Province, Bulgaria
 , a village in the municipality of Hissar, Plovdiv Province, Bulgaria